Tracy Ellen Davis (born 8 December 1962) is an Australian politician.  She was a Liberal National Party member of the Legislative Assembly of Queensland from 2009 to 2017, representing the district of Aspley. She currently serves on the Brisbane City Council as the Councillor for McDowall Ward.

Early life 
Davis was born in Nambour, Queensland, but attended primary school at East Hills in New South Wales. She attended high school at Pine Rivers, and in 1982 and became a receptionist. She became a small business owner in 1995.

Politics

Member of parliament
In 2009, Davis defeated Labor MP Bonny Barry to win the seat of Aspley for the Liberal National Party. She had previously contested Aspley in 2006 as a Liberal candidate, as well as Everton in 2004.

Davis was appointed the Shadow Minister for Public Transport following a Langbroek Cabinet shuffle in November 2010. In 2011 she was appointed as Shadow Minister for Disability Services, Mental Health and Child Safety.

Newman Ministry
She served as Minister for Communities, Child Safety and Disabilities in the Newman government. 

After the LNP defeat at the 2015 election remained on the front bench as Shadow Minister for Communities, Child Safety and Disability Services under Lawrence Springborg, before moving to Shadow Education portfolio following Tim Nicholls's successful challenge to Springborg.

She lost her seat to Labor candidate Bart Mellish at the 2017 election.

Brisbane City Council
In 2019 Davis became Brisbane City Councillor for McDowall Ward to replace Councillor Norm Wyndham. She successfully contested the Ward at the 2020 Queensland local government elections, winning 59.2% of the primary vote. The McDowall Ward comprises the suburbs of McDowall, Everton Park and parts of Aspley, Bridgeman Downs, Chermside West, Stafford and Stafford Heights.

As of 2022, Davis is the Civic Cabinet Chair of the Environment, Parks and Sustainability Committee and also previously served on the City Standards Committee. She is also a Lord Mayor’s representative for multicultural communities.

References

1962 births
Living people
Members of the Queensland Legislative Assembly
Liberal National Party of Queensland politicians
21st-century Australian politicians
21st-century Australian women politicians
Women members of the Queensland Legislative Assembly